Eudactylina is a genus of copepods that parasitise elasmobranch fishes. It contains the following species:

References

Siphonostomatoida
Taxa described in 1853
Taxa named by Pierre-Joseph van Beneden